Jokisch is a surname. Notable people with the surname include:

Eric Jokisch (born 1989), American baseball player
Rodrigo Jokisch (born 1946), German sociologist